Somebody Is Waiting is a 1996 American drama film written and directed by Martin Donovan and starring Gabriel Byrne and Nastassja Kinski.

Plot

Cast
Gabriel Byrne as Roger Ellis
Nastassja Kinski as Charlotte Ellis
Johnny Whitworth as Leon Ellis
Brian Donovan as Clayton
Tyler Cole Malinger as Adlai
Lynn Fine as Jacqueline
Michael Malota as Kennedy
Gary Bairos as Daniel
Rebecca Gayheart as Lilli
Shirley Knight as Irma Call
Maria Daleo as Erica Macaluzzo

Production
Principal photography took place around Santa Cruz, California for four weeks.

Reception
Mike D'Angelo of Entertainment Weekly graded the film a D.

References

External links
 
 

American drama films
Films shot in California
Films directed by Martin Donovan (screenwriter)
1990s English-language films
1990s American films
1996 drama films